Antarcticimonas is a Gram-negative, obligately aerobic and rod-shaped genus of bacteria from the family of Flavobacteriaceae with one known species (Antarcticimonas flava). Antarcticimonas flava has been isolated from seawater from the coast of the Antarctic.

References

Flavobacteria
Bacteria genera
Monotypic bacteria genera
Taxa described in 2014